The Windera Branch Railway is a branch railway line from Barlil to Windera in Queensland, Australia.

History 

On Saturday 28 March 1925, the railway line from Barlil to Windera was officially opened by Alfred James Jones, the Minister for Mines and formerly the Member of the Queensland Legislative Assembly for Burnett. The line passed through sidings at Warnung, Cloyna, and Kitoba.  Its existence was never really justified despite handling regular pig and cream traffic plus occasional livestock.  The uneconomic branch closed from 1 July 1961.

References

External links
 1925 map of the Queensland railway system

Closed railway lines in Queensland
Railway lines opened in 1925
Railway lines closed in 1961